The Airport Security Unit (ASU) is the airport police of the Hong Kong Police Force tasked with the security of the Hong Kong International Airport. The ASU was originally formed in 1977 as the Special Action Squad on standby for security at Kai Tak Airport and in 1978 following a review it was renamed as the Airport Security Unit and commenced patrolling the airport. In 1998, the ASU moved to the Chek Lap Kok Airport.

Duties
ASU is responsible for airport security, primarily targeting terrorist situations such as aircraft hijacking, but in urgent situations, is used as a backup force for situations outside of the airport.

ASU officers can be identified by their distinctive deep blue uniform and are armed with sub machine guns as well as semi-automatic pistols. They also have different patches.

Training
Applicants for the ASU need to complete a two phase selection course the first phase is a one-day fitness test and the second phase is over four days and then complete a ten-week training course. The first woman joined the ASU in 2003.

The ASU has a training range for firing simunition with corridors, rooms and check-in counters to simulate the airport terminal and also a mock-up of an aircraft interior to simulate a plane.

Weapons
 Glock 17 - Standard issue sidearm for all ASU officers, loaded with 17 round of 9mm Parabellum magazines and carried in a drop leg holster
 Heckler & Koch MP5 - Standard issue SMG for all ASU officers. Loaded with 30 round of 9mm Parabellum magazines, the MP5 could be deployed in multiple variants, such as A3, A5 and RAS versions.
 KAC SR-16 M4 - One of the standard issue rifles of ASU.

In popular culture
Compared to other units, the Airport Security Unit rarely appeared in the mass media, and there has yet to be any movie or television dedicated to them. However, the Unit was featured occasionally as part of films typically of the Cantonese-action genre:

Film
Fatal Termination (1990)
Purple Storm (1999)
Gen-Y Cops (2000)
Hit Team (2001)
Connected (2008)
New Police Story movies
Rush Hour movies
2000 AD (film)
Knock Off (film) (1998)

Television
Sergeant Tabloid (2012)
Airport Strikers 「機場特警」(2020)

See also
 Police Tactical Unit (Hong Kong)
 Special Duties Unit
 Special Tactical Squad

References

External links
 香港警察紀律部隊-ASU機場特警隊

Hong Kong Police Force
Special forces of Hong Kong
Hong Kong
Counterterrorism
1977 establishments in Hong Kong
Airport law enforcement agencies
Hong Kong International Airport